A Sporting Chance is a 1945 American comedy film directed by George Blair and starring Jane Randolph, John O'Malley and Steve Barclay. The screenplay concerns a spoiled young woman who has to get and keep a job before she is entitled to claim her inheritance.

The film's sets were designed by the art director Russell Kimball.

Cast
 Jane Randolph as Pamela Herrick  
 John O'Malley as Steve Walker  
 Steve Barclay as Ted Cummings  
 Edward Gargan as Mike Ryan  
 Isabel Withers as Susan Bailey  
 Maxine Semon as Gert  
 Selmer Jackson as John Smalley  
 Robert Middlemass as William Reardon  
 Kenne Duncan as Boarder  
 Janet Martin as Specialty

References

Bibliography
  Len D. Martin. The Republic Pictures Checklist: Features, Serials, Cartoons, Short Subjects and Training Films of Republic Pictures Corporation, 1935-1959. McFarland, 1998.

External links
 

1945 films
1945 comedy films
American comedy films
Films directed by George Blair
Republic Pictures films
American black-and-white films
1940s English-language films
1940s American films